

Fafnir

Falcon

Sam Wilson

Joaquin Torres

Falcona

Falligar the Behemoth
Falligar the Behemoth, also known simply as Falligar, is a fictional deity who makes a single appearance in Thor: God of Thunder #3 (December 2012), as one of the victims of Gorr the God Butcher, who killed Falligar and left his corpse rotting on the shores of his home planet, with his worshipers surrounding him and praying for his resurrection.

Falligar the Behemoth in other media
 Falligar the Behemoth's corpse appears in the Marvel Cinematic Universe film Thor: Love and Thunder (2022).

Famine
One of the Horsemen_of_Apocalypse

Fancy Dan

Fandral

Fang

Fang is a fictional character appearing in American comic books published by Marvel Comics.

Fang is a Lupak who is a member of the Royal Elite of the Shi'ar Imperial Guard. Created by Chris Claremont and Dave Cockrum, the character first appeared in X-Men #107 (October 1977). Fang appears to be a hybrid of an alien and a wolf; he has superhuman senses, strength, speed, stamina, durability, agility, and reflexes, as well as claws and fangs. In recent years, the character has developed new abilities, including teleportation, flight, and energy projection/matter manipulation. (Like many original members of the Imperial Guard, Fang is the analog of a character from DC Comics' Legion of Super-Heroes: in his case Timber Wolf.)

He joins the other Imperial Guardsmen in battle against the X-Men on behalf of Emperor D'Ken on a nameless Shi'ar Empire planet. He is attacked by Wolverine, who defeats him and strips him of his costume, using it to sneak up on the other Imperial Guardsmen.

Fang later becomes a "Borderer": a Guardsman stationed on one of the Shi'ar's conquered worlds to help its governor enforce Shi'ar law there. Fang and a small number of other Guardsmen become renegades and turn traitor, betraying the Shi'ar Empire by serving Deathbird in her attempt to overthrow her sister Princess-Majestrix Lilandra. This incident involves Lord Samedar attempting to use some of the outlaw Guard in order to attack the Earth. His faction is opposed by other Shi'ar and the X-Men, the renegade Guardsmen battling the loyal Guardsmen, and Fang fighting Nightcrawler during the conflict. The Brood interfere with a concussion-style bomb secretly hidden in the midst of the battle.

Soon after this incident, Fang is apparently slain when the Brood uses him as a host body for the egg of one of their young on the "Broodworld", former home-world of the Brood. His body is consumed and transformed by the Brood embryo implanted inside him, and the resulting Brood alien later fights Wolverine, who kills it.

When the original Fang is killed, another Lupak, named Nev-Darr, is enlisted to take the place of the original Fang on the Imperial Guard. When that one is killed a third one takes his place.

In Untold Legend of Captain Marvel — which takes place before his first encounter with the X-Men — Fang, the Guard, Captain Marvel, and the Kree face an attack by the Brood. A small division of the Guard — Starbolt, Smasher, Fang, and Oracle — are selected to guard the personage of Deathbird, the current regent of the Shi'ar empire. They ally, then fight with the Kree, after the latter come to their assistance against a murderous attack from the Skrulls.

Fang is seen as loyal Shi'ar warrior when they go to war with the Inhuman-led Kree. One of many battles in this war leads Fang and many others to the base of the Guardians of the Galaxy, a giant flowing head called Knowhere.

Fang is one of the many Shi'ar soldiers assigned to team up with the Starjammers to investigate "The Fault," a space-time anomaly that not only threatens Shi'ar space, but all of reality.

Fang reappears years later on Earth. He comes to visit Wolverine, only to discover that his "old buddy" had died. Fang eventually reveals all of his history with Logan to X-23 (Laura Kinney: codename "Wolverine"), revealing how he came back to life after being killed by the Brood. According to Fang, the Lupak reproduce through cloning and keep mental templates of their citizens on file. When one of them dies, a new one is made. He reveals to X-23 that while he is not the Fang Wolverine met back in X-Men #107, as a clone, he is still technically the one Wolverine knew.

Fang assists the Guardians of the Galaxy and X-23 in stopping a Brood infestation of a scientific facility.

Fantasia
Fantasia is a fictional character in the Marvel Universe. She first appeared in Captain America #352-353 (April–May 1989), and was created by Mark Gruenwald and Kieron Dwyer. The character subsequently appears as Fantasma beginning in The Avengers #319-324 (July–October 1990).

Fantasia was a member of the Supreme Soviets. The team had been sent by the Soviet government to capture the Soviet Super-Soldiers, who were attempting to defect to the United States. Fantasia disguised the team members with an illusion to appear as members of the Avengers: Red Guardian as Captain America, Perun as Thor, Crimson Dynamo as Iron Man, and Sputnik as the Vision. Eventually, the real Captain America defeated the Supreme Soviets and freed the badly wounded Soviet Super-Soldiers.

Fantasia later changed her name to Fantasma when the team became known as the People's Protectorate. Eventually the team broke up and merged with the Soviet Super-Soldiers to form the Winter Guard.

Fantasma is rescued from a time anomaly by the Winter Guard, with her former teammates of the Protectorate on her trail. It is revealed that Fantasma is a Dire Wraith queen, and she aligns herself with the Presence and fights the Winter Guard. She is defeated by banishing her into Limbo again.

Fantasia is a Russian soldier with super-powers. She is skilled in magic, especially in the use of illusions. She has also shown the ability to fly and certain mental abilities.

Fantomex

Kat Farrell
Kat Farrell first appeared in Deadline #1 and was created by Bill Rosemann. A reporter for the Daily Bugle, Farrell is the co-head of The Pulse, a section of the Bugle which focuses on superheroes.

Initially, Farrell is interested in reporting on 'real' heroes, such as police officers and firefighters, and did not like being forced to cover superheroes.

Following six supervillain homicides, Farrell is led to murdered judge Michael Hart, who presided solely over superhero crimes. Hart's wife had also been murdered. The police suspect that it was a double homicide or Hart had killed his wife first. Farrell discovers that Hart had been murdered by the Tinkerer. He had returned, though, with supernatural powers. Paul Swanson, fellow reporter, breaks into her apartment and kills her fish in an attempt to scare her off the case. Undeterred, she nevertheless decides to drop the story anyway, to protect Hart.

Farrell also participates in the investigation of fellow journalist Teri Kidder's death, and was the first to interview Luke Cage when he brought the villain Green Goblin to justice.

Other versions of Kat Farrell
In the "House Of M" alternate reality, Farrell is still a reporter. She wants to write the truth but meets resistance because the ruling mutant class controls the newspapers. At one point she meets Hawkeye, who is aware that reality has been altered.

Fasaud

Fatale

Father Time

Joe Faulkner

Fenris Wolf

Feral

Fer-de-Lance

Ferocia

Ferocia is a fictional character appearing in American comic books published by Marvel Comics.

Fera was a K'un-Lun wolf whose pack killed Heather Rand outside of K'un-Lun. She was later evolved by the magics of Shirrair and has become a servant of Master Khan under the name Ferocia.

Feron

Connie Ferrari

Connie Ferrari is a fictional defense lawyer in Marvel Comics. The character, created by Mark Waid and Andy Kubert, first appeared in Captain America (vol. 3) #20 (August 1999).

Connie Ferrari was a well noted New York attorney. She met and started dating Steve Rogers who, unbeknownst to her, was actually Captain America. Their relationship would soon hit a snag due to Ferrari's continual defense towards criminals, most notably her brother David who was the Answer. When Ferrari found out that Rogers and Cap were one and the same, she felt betrayed and broke up with him. Rogers later worked up the courage to apologize to her and the two parted as friends.

Later, Ferrari became the Avengers' attorney and gained an assistant named Amy. She seems to somewhat regret breaking up with Rogers as she has started dating men who look like him. She discovers that Flatman unintentionally bought the rights to the name Avengers and comes asking to buy them from him. He agrees under the condition that the Great Lakes Avengers be made official members of the team and she begrudgingly accepts. She later bails the team out of jail, after getting arrested over a bar fight, and inducts Goodness Silva as a member, so that she doesn't get prosecuted by the authorities. During a visit to the GLA's headquarters, Connie discovers that the team had kidnapped Councilman Dick Snerd, who was the super-villain Nain Rouge. They later find out that Good Boy had attacked him, leaving him seriously injured, and drop him at a hospital. Connie then tells the team to lie low for a couple of days and stay out of trouble.

Ferret
The Ferret is a Timely Comics character who first appeared in Marvel Mystery Comics #4 (February 1940). He was a generic detective whose only notable feature was his pet ferret, Nosie. He wears a bulletproof vest and carries a gun.

The Ferret appeared in six stories during the Golden Age of Comic Books, in Marvel Mystery Comics #4-9. In 2009, he appeared in the Marvel Mystery Comics 70th Anniversary Special and several issues of The Marvels Project, a limited series.

The Ferret aka Leslie Lenrow was a New York City based private investigator. He often consulted with the police on cases. In one case, he worked with Namor and his companion Betty Dean, the Human Torch and his sidekick Toro, the Angel, and Electro and his creator Philo Zog to defeat Nazi Dr. Manyac, his green flame robots, and Project: Blockbuster, a giant version of the green flame robots.

In 1940, during a seemingly routine missing persons case, the Ferret and Nosie tailed a Professor Hamilton to a nondescript brownstone. In reality, Hamilton was a Nazi spy named Albrecht Kerfoot and the brownstone was a meeting place for spies. The Ferret was caught and stabbed in the heart with a dagger. His body was found by the Angel, who adopted his pet ferret and trailed the spies, eventually working with Captain America and Bucky to defeat them.

Philip Fetter

Fever Pitch
One of the Morlocks

Fiery Mask
Fiery Mask (real name Jack Castle) is a fictional character appearing in American comic books published by Marvel Comics. He was a Golden Age superhero created by Joe Simon and first appeared in Daring Mystery Comics #1 from Timely Comics.

He first appeared in Daring Mystery Comics #1, then in issues #5-6 and then in Human Torch Comics #2. He returned in 2008 in The Twelve. Chris Weston has referred to him as "Marvel's Green Lantern."

Fin

Fin Fang Foom

Finesse

Fire-Eater
Tomas Ramirez was born in Madrid, Spain. He uses the traditional methods of circus fire-eaters, and can consume flame within his mouth and then project it from his mouth without suffering injury. He uses incendiary "inferno discs" designed by himself and the Clown.  He works for the criminal organization, the Circus of Crime.

Firearm

Firebird

Firebrand

Gary Gilbert

Russ Broxtel

Rick Dennison

Amanda

Erikson Hades

Firelord

Firepower

Jack Taggert

David Roberts

Firestar

Richard Fisk

Vanessa Fisk

Leo Fitz

Fixx

Fixer

Roscoe Sweeney

Paul Norbert Ebersol

Flag-Smasher

Karl Morgenthau

Guy Thierrault

Flashback

Flashfire

Flashfire, originally code-named Tempest, is a member of the Shi'ar Imperial Guard. The character, created by writer Chris Claremont and artist Dave Cockrum, first appeared in Uncanny X-Men #107 (October 1977). Flashfire can generate and fire bursts of light and electricity. Like many original members of the Imperial Guard, Tempest/Flashfire is the analog of a character from DC Comics' Legion of Super-Heroes: in his case Lightning Lad. Flashfire's alter-ego is Grannz; Lightning Lad's is Garth Ranzz. At one point, Grannz was engaged to marry fellow Guardsman Oracle (an analog of Saturn Girl, to whom Lightning Lad was also romantically linked).

Part of the division of the Imperial Guard known as the Superguardians, Tempest is amongst the first of the Imperial Guard encountered by the team of superhuman mutant adventurers known as the X-Men who sought to rescue the Princess-Majestrix Lilandra Neramani from her insane brother, then-Majestor D'Ken. After the battle, Lilandra takes over as Majestrix, and the Guard swears allegiance to her.

Deathbird's second attempt at a coup is successful, and she becomes Shi'ar Empress. Tempest is with the Guard when they come into conflict with a rogue Space Knight named Pulsar and an alien named Tyreseus. After a large battle which also involves Rom and other Space Knights — which leads to the deaths of four new Guardsman — Pulsar and Tyreseus are defeated.

Empress Deathbird commands the entire Imperial Guard, including Tempest, to fight the combined forces of the Starjammers and Excalibur on Earth so that she can claim the power of the Phoenix Force for herself. The Guard are forced to retreat when Deathbird is put in danger. (Some time later War Skrulls impersonating Charles Xavier and the Starjammers depose Deathbird and restore Lilandra Neramani to the throne. Deathbird cedes the empire back to Lilandra as she has grown bored of the bureaucracy.)

Tempest is again part of the mission during Operation: Galactic Storm, an intergalactic war between the Shi'ar and the Kree. The Imperial Guard are integral to the Sh'iar creating a massive super weapon — the "Nega-Bomb" — using Kree artifacts, including the original Captain Marvel's Nega-Bands, which the Guard steals from the dead hero's tomb. This bomb is capable of devastating an area equivalent to that of the Kree Empire (which is supposedly located throughout the Large Magellanic Cloud). Ultimately, the Nega Bomb device is successfully detonated, devastating the Kree Empire, with billions dying instantaneously (98% of the Kree population). The Shi'ar annex the remnants of the Kree Empire, with Deathbird becoming viceroy of the Kree territories.

Tempest is renamed Flashfire in the first issue of the Imperial Guard limited series, because of the pre-existing DC character named Joshua Clay (Tempest).

Flashfire has many further adventures with the Imperial Guard, in storylines involving Ronan the Accuser and the Inhumans, and such storylines as "Emperor Vulcan," "Secret Invasion," "X-Men: Kingbreaker," "War of Kings," "Realm of Kings," the "Infinity" crossover, the "Trial of Jean Grey," "Time Runs Out," and the return of Thanos.

Flatman

Flex

Flexo the Rubber Man
Flexo the Rubber Man is a robot created from a form of "live" rubber and appeared in Mystic Comics #1-4.

Flint

Flint (Jaycen) is an Inhuman in Marvel Comics. The character, created by Charles Soule and Joe Madureira, first appeared in Inhuman #3 (October 2014).

Flint was Jason, a young African-born American boy who was adopted by Martin (a white man and his wife). Though Jason loved his parents, he felt out of place, mostly because in the community he grew up in he was the only black person. One day, the Terrigen mists arrived and Martin, who was actually an Inhuman, told Jason to embrace their destiny. Jason emerged from his cocoon and was immediately recruited by Lash. He is renamed Korvostax and forced by Lash and the rest of his team to fight the Royal Family, feeling that they were unworthy of being Inhumans. Lash was defeated by Medusa and Jason opted to join the Inhumans in New Attilan. During the fight, he discovered that he had geokinesis, the ability to control the earth and rocks, and could also encase himself in a rock-like body.

While in New Attilan, he learns that his biological family is still in Africa. Soon after he takes the Flint name, Jason finally visits his birthplace Utolan, and discovers his biological mother Irellis and sister Ikelli. Out of respect, Jason changes the spelling of his name to Jaycen. He also starts a relationship with fellow Inhuman Iso.

Flint accompanies Crystal's team in investigating the strange skyscrapers in China. When the skyscraper causes Collective Man to lose his powers and split into the five brothers, one is nearly killed by Flint.

Flint in other media
 Flint appears in the Avengers Assemble four-part episode "Civil War", voiced by James C. Mathis III.
 Flint appears in Agents of S.H.I.E.L.D., portrayed by Coy Stewart. This version is a young inhabitant of a former S.H.I.E.L.D. base called the Lighthouse, which the Kree took over, who hails from decades in the future. Introduced in the fifth season, the Kree subject him to Terrigenesis, but he is rescued by S.H.I.E.L.D. agent Elena "Yo-Yo" Rodriguez and later discovers his geokinetic powers. Flint later helps Rodriguez and her team rescue the Lighthouse's human inhabitants before using his powers on an alien Monolith to create a portal and send the S.H.I.E.L.D. agents back to their time while he stays behind to protect the refugees and rebuild the destroyed Earth. In the sixth season, Izel uses the energies of her three Di'Allis' to create a clone of Flint from Mack and Yo-Yo's fears and memories before possessing him so she can use his abilities to rebuild the Di'Allis until Agent Piper rescues him and takes him to safety. In the series finale "What We're Fighting For", Leo Fitz, Jemma Simmons, and Enoch recruit Flint and Piper to protect them while they help their friends defeat the Chronicoms. A year later, Flint has become a student of S.H.I.E.L.D.'s Coulson Academy under Melinda May.
 Flint appears in Marvel Future Avengers, voiced by Motoki Sakuma in Japanese and John Eric Bentley in English.

Flipside

Sally Floyd

Flux
Flux is the name of two different characters appearing in American comic books published by Marvel Comics.

Benjamin Tibbits
Private Benjamin "Benny" Tibbets was a Private First Class in the United States Army and a soldier with unresolved mother issues. He, along with a platoon of soldiers, were exposed to a gamma bomb by General Ryker, who wished to test its effects on humans. Tibbets was the sole survivor. He was transformed into a Hulk-like creature with superhuman strength. The only differences were that Tibbets, nicknamed Flux, looked more misshapen, his forehead and joints significantly more pronounced, and his transformation was more erratic, parts of him sometimes transforming while the rest of him remained human. Convinced by Ryker that Bruce Banner was responsible for his condition, and had sold gamma technology to the Iraqis, Flux was sent after the Hulk, but the fight proved one-sided and Banner was able to talk him down. Tibbets underwent psychiatric evaluation thanks to Doc Samson, but he was subsequently recaptured and broken by Ryker. Regressed to a childlike mentality and vocabulary, apparently perceiving Ryker as his 'mommy', Flux was once again pitted against the Hulk, but the fight ended when General Ross forced Ryker to stand down. Without Ryker's commands, Flux stopped fighting and broke down, reverting to Benny as he wept for his mother.

Recently, Flux was revealed to be in A.I.M.'s custody, who experimented on him. However, he was killed by Grey of the Gamma Corps during a raid on the A.I.M. base.

During the "Damnation" storyline, Flux was cast down into Hell after his death and is one of the damned souls who Johnny Blaze and Zarathos encounter there alongside Elephantine, a Jack O'Lantern, and Richard Fisk.

Dennis Sykes
Dennis Sykes is a banker who appeared in the story 1 Month 2 Live. He gains superpowers and an untreatable cancer following an accident with toxic waste. With a life expectancy of barely a month, Sykes launches himself on a brief career as a superhero, in an attempt to make a difference in the world while he still can, assisting the Fantastic Four in saving Ego the Living Planet from a cancerous infection and averting Hammerhead's attempt to take control of his neighborhood. Although use of his powers made his condition worse, Sykes makes a positive impression on many heroes with his dedication to doing the right thing, accepting training from Spider-Man and receiving honorary membership with the Fantastic Four and the Avengers before he finally dies of stress from his final battle. His wife was by his side when he died. To honor him, a statue of Flux was erected at the children's hospital he helped after getting his powers.

Flux in other media
The Benjamin Tibbets version of Flux appears in the Hulk video game adaption, voiced by Lee Tockar. Flux appears as one of the Hulk's opponents, challenging the Hulk when he attempts to destroy a force field generator keeping him confined in a military base. He seems to share the backstory of the comic book version, but no reference is made to the specific details of his origin, although it's implied to be the same. After he is defeated, Flux is thrown into the force field generator and is severely injured. At the end of the game, Flux is seen in a base where he is being treated from the injuries he sustained under General Ryker's care.

Flying Tiger

Mickey Fondozzi

Foolkiller

Forbush Man

Force

Forearm

Foreigner

Forge

Lee Forrester

Forgotten One

Don Fortunato

Dominic Fortune

Jane Foster

Frederick Foswell

Foxbat

Foxfire

Frankenstein's Monster

Freak

Happy Hogan

Eddie March

Spider-Man villain

Freakshow

Free Spirit

Freebooter
Freebooter (Brandon Cross) is a fictional character who appeared in the Marvel Comics' series A-Next. He was created by Tom DeFalco and Brent Anderson, and first appeared in A-Next #4 (1999).

Brandon Cross was a protégé of Hawkeye and Swordsman. He was invited to join the "Dream Team" of new Avengers who were going to become members of A-Next. Donning a Hawkeye-like costume, he assumed the guise of the roguish "Freebooter".

Freebooter quickly displayed a tendency to be a "ladies' man" and poured on the charm for teammate Stinger and found her totally unreceptive to him. Stinger was outraged that new Avengers were being added to the team without her knowledge or permission, and felt no desire to fraternize with the new recruits (especially Freebooter), but in due time Freebooter's fighting skills earned her respect, and his heroic, chivalrous nature her affections. He became a valuable member of the team, but tragedy struck when his close friend and fellow "Dream Teamer" Crimson Curse was killed in the line of duty. Freebooter lost his carefree attitude and became more withdrawn, but he still fought the forces of evil in her honor.

During the events of Last Planet Standing, Freebooter was badly injured, but received help from the former villain Sabreclaw, whom he later convinced to join A-Next while he was recuperating. Freebooter later returns to active Avengers duty.

Freebooter has no powers, but has outstanding swordsmanship skills and is an expert archer. His weapon of choice is a retractable bo staff.

Freedom Ring

Spike Freeman

Frenchie

Frenzy

Freya

Friday

Friction

Sharon Friedlander

Frigga

Frog-Man

Frog-Man is the name of two fictional characters appearing in American comic books published by Marvel Comics.

François LeBlanc
François LeBlanc first appeared in Daredevil #10–11 (October and December 1965), and was created by Stan Lee and Wally Wood. 

LeBlanc, a man with Olympic-level leaping skills, is among those recruited by the Organizer, secretly a candidate for the New York mayorship, to form the Ani-Men. The team goes on missions to undermine the current administration. Daredevil defeats them and they all go to prison. The Ani-Men later work for Count Nefaria, whose scientists submit the unwitting Ani-Men to processes that temporarily give them superhuman powers and animal-like forms. LeBlanc gains superhuman strength and stamina, along with frog-like legs. They invade the Cheyenne Mountain missile base and fight the X-Men. After they lose their powers the team is sent to kill Tony Stark, themselves dying by a bomb that Spymaster had planted to kill Stark.

Eugene Patilio

Adrienne Frost

Carmilla Frost 

Carmilla Frost is a freedom fighter and member of Killraven's Freemen in a post-apocalyptic alternate future of the Marvel Universe.

The character, created by Don McGregor and Herb Trimpe, first appeared in Amazing Adventures (vol. 2) #21 (November 1973) and continued to appear in most issues of the title through #39.

Carmilla is from an alternate-reality Earth run by Martians. In 2001, she and her father Andre are taken to the Martians' Yankee Stadium Genetic and Clonal Complex. Andre is blackmailed with threats to his daughter into helping the Martians in performing cloning research. In 2004 she begins assisting her father in his experiments, and eventually becomes an expert molecular biologist. By 2010 she becomes the youngest human designated as a Keeper by the Martians. In 2014 she refuses to conduct cloning experiments on other humans, but two years later, after a Martian Overlord kills Andre, she agrees to clone his corpse in an attempt to restore him to life. Her efforts fail, instead producing the mutated creature Grok. In 2018 she helps Killraven escape from captivity from the Yankee Stadium Genetic and Clonal Complex and joins his Freemen. In 2020 she learns that she is pregnant with the Freeman M'Shulla's child.

She and her newborn son Skar are rescued by the cross-reality traveling Machine Man and Howard the Duck.

Christian Frost
Christian Frost is the brother of Cordelia, Adrienne and Emma Frost. He was created by Grant Morrison and Phil Jimenez and made his first appearance in New X-Men #139 (June 2003).

Not wanting anything to do with the family business, Christian often clashed with his father Winston. When Winston learned that his son was gay, he threatened to disown him and forced Christian to dump his then-boyfriend and move into the family home with him. Christian refused and cut ties with his entire family, only remaining in contact with Emma, his closest confidante. In retaliation, Winston used his power to have Christian's boyfriend deported, leading Christian to develop a substance abuse problem as a way to cope with the resulting depression. As his addiction worsened, a concerned Emma asked their father to help him get clean and Winston gladly welcomed his son back before turning on him and locking him in a mental institution in order to "cure" him of being gay once Emma had left. Following the conversion therapy, Christian was released and reinstated as the heir to the Frost business. Christian subsequently murdered Winston as revenge for the years of abuse his father had subjected him to and took over his business empire.

After becoming suspicious that her father had appointed Christian as heir to the business, Emma visited his mansion and was greeted by her father. Demanding to see Christian, Winston refused and exhibited never-before-seen psychic powers to force her to retreat. Worried for her brother's safety, Emma approached Iceman and he agreed to help rescue Christian from her father. When they returned to the mansion, they fought through several psychic apparitions before discovering Winston's body in his study. While Iceman bought her time, Emma reached out and discovered that Christian was the one causing the apparitions, including that of their father. Emma's attempts to reach Christian's mind were in vain as, in the midst of a mental breakdown causing him to lose control of his powers, Christian was unable to hear her. As the Frost siblings were unable to directly infiltrate each other's minds, Emma created a telepathic link between Iceman and Christian, allowing them to communicate. Iceman, having recently been outed, empathised with Christian's homophobic experiences and managed to calm him down enough for him to regain control. Emma thanked Iceman and decided to stay with her brother to help him come to terms with what had happened and get him back on his feet.

After the mutant nation of Krakoa is formed, Emma re-establishes the Hellfire Club as the Hellfire Trading Company which aims to help distribute supplies in service of mutants, with Emma once again as its White Queen. Emma brings Christian into the fold, appointing him as her White Bishop. Christian begins to become closer with Iceman through his work for the Company and the two begin a casual relationship.

Powers and abilities
Unlike his siblings, Christian's psychic powers did not emerge when he was younger and appear to have developed much more recently. He has the ability to draw upon and materialize energy from the astral plane and create Avatars of energy constructs or project it as a destructive psionic energy blast which causes both physical and mental damage. His newly manifested abilities are extremely powerful, as his projection of Winston was robust enough to convince Emma, herself a particularly advanced telepath, that it was her actual father.

Deacon Frost

Emma Frost

Rumiko Fujikawa

Fury

Jake Fury

Mikel Fury

Nick Fury

Nick Fury Jr.

Vernon Fury

Fusion

Hubert and Pinky Fusser

Markley

Futurist

References

Marvel Comics characters: F, List of